Melanoma-derived growth regulatory protein is a protein that in humans is encoded by the MIA gene.

It is a marker for malignant melanoma.

References

Further reading

Human proteins